Joselu (José Luis Mato Sanmartín, born 27 March 1990) is a Spanish football forward

Joselu may also refer to:
 Joselu (footballer, born 1990), (José Luis Gómez Hurtado), Spanish football winger
 Joselu (footballer, born 1991), (José Luis Moreno Barroso), Spanish football forward